Lavale Thomas is a former running back in the National Football League.

Biography
Thomas was born Lavale Alvin Thomas on December 12, 1963 in Los Angeles, California.

Career
Thomas played two seasons for the Green Bay Packers. He played at the collegiate level at California State University, Fresno.

See also
List of Green Bay Packers players

References

1963 births
Living people
Players of American football from Los Angeles
Kansas City Chiefs players
Green Bay Packers players
American football running backs
Fresno State Bulldogs football players